Cnemaspis whittenorum is a species of gecko, a lizard in the family Gekkonidae. The species is endemic to the Mentawai Islands in  Indonesia.

Etymology
The specific name, whittenorum (genitive plural), is in honor of zoologists Anthony John Whitten and Jane E. J. Whitten, husband and wife.

Description
C. whittenorum is a small species.

Reproduction
C. whittenorum is oviparous.

References

Further reading
Das I (2005). "Revision of the Genus Cnemaspis Strauch, 1887 (Sauria: Gekkonidae), from the Mentawai and Adjacent Archipelagos off Western Sumatra, Indonesia, with the Description of Four New Species". Journal of Herpetology 39 (2): 233–247. (Cnemaspis whittenorum, new species).

whittenorum
Reptiles described in 2005